Lysine-rich nucleolar protein 1 (KNOP1) is a protein which in human's is encoded by the KNOP1 gene. Aliases for KNOP1 include TSG118, C16orf88, and FAM191A. 


Gene
KNOP1 is located on the negative DNA strand of chromosome 16 at 16p12.3. It spans 15.21 kb, from 19729556 to 19714347 and has 6 exons which are alternatively spliced in the RNA to create three main transcript isoforms.  Two of the KNOP1 isoforms, B and C, lack exon 1, shifting the start codon used to the one found in exon 2, and so the proteins encoded by these lack sequence at N-terminus. Isoform C also does not contain exon 4, which encodes the C-terminal DUF5595 domain.

Gene Neighborhood
The genes surrounding KNOP1 are VPS35L which is upstream and IQCK which is downstream of KNOP1. The IQCK gene was identified to be a potential candidate for obsessive-compulsive disorder in a genome-wide association study. The VPS35L encodes the protein VPS35L that acts as a component of the retriever complex.

Gene Expression

KNOP1 has high levels of expression in the superior cervical ganglion, testis, placenta, and in early stages of hear and lung development. KNOP1 showed low levels of expression in the liver and pancreas.

Species distribution
There are many orthologs of KNOP1 in many different species of animals but not in the other kingdoms. No paralogs of KNOP1 were found. Table 1 lists select KNOP1 orthologs.

Protein
The exact function of KNOP1 is not yet understood it is hypothesized to mimic nucleostemin, a nucleolar protein linked to the proliferation potential of stem cells. The protein is 518 amino acids long, Isoform B is 458 amino acids, and Isoform C is 435 amino acids. It has a molecular weight of 58 kdal and an isoelectric point of 9.92  The protein is rich in lysine and has a lysine-rich region from amino acid 123-355. There is a region of the protein that interacts with the protein ZNF106. Some papers have associated it with the surface of the condensed chromosomes.

Domains

KNOP1 has two domains Duf5595 (Not found in isoform C) and SMAP located at the end of the protein. DUF5595 is found in Nude C 80 (Ndc80) proteins which can be found in species such as Homo sapiens. Ndc80 protein complexes are a core component of the end-on attachment sites for kinetochore microtubules. SMAP (Small acidic protein family) is found in eukaryotes, and is approximately 70 amino acids in length. There is a single completely conserved residue G that may be functionally important at G441

Interacting protein
KNOP1 has been shown to interact with ZNF106 and has been confirmed by Grasberger, H., & Bell, G. I. This study concluded that the rapid downregulation of KNOP1 expression during in vitro terminal differentiation coincides with a loss of nucleolar ZFP106.

References

Genes